Cristian Garín defeated Casper Ruud in the final, 7–6(7–4), 4–6, 6–3, to win the singles tennis title at the 2019 U.S. Men's Clay Court Championships. The win earned Garín his first career Association of Tennis Professionals (ATP) singles title and made him the first Chilean ATP title holder in ten years. Ruud was also in contention to win his first ATP Tour title after reaching his first final, joining father Christian Ruud as the only two Norwegian players to reach a final at this level.

Steve Johnson was the two-time defending champion, but he lost in the second round to Daniel Elahi Galán.

Seeds
The top four seeds received a bye into the second round.

Draw

Finals

Top half

Bottom half

Qualifying

Seeds

Qualifiers

Qualifying draw

First qualifier

Second qualifier

Third qualifier

Fourth qualifier

References

External links
Main draw
Qualifying draw

Singles